HEPA (high-efficiency particulate air) filter, also known as high-efficiency particulate absorbing filter and high-efficiency particulate arrestance filter, is an efficiency standard of air filters.

Filters meeting the HEPA standard must satisfy certain levels of efficiency. Common standards require that a HEPA air filter must remove—from the air that passes through—at least 99.95% (ISO, European Standard) or 99.97% (ASME, U.S. DOE) of particles whose diameter is equal to 0.3 μm, with the filtration efficiency increasing for particle diameters both less than and greater than 0.3 μm. HEPA filters capture pollen, dirt, dust, moisture, bacteria (0.2-2.0 μm), virus (0.02-0.3 μm), and submicron liquid aerosol (0.02-0.5 μm). Some microorganisms, for example, Aspergillus niger, Penicillium citrinum, Staphylococcus epidermidis, and Bacillus subtilis are captured by HEPA filters with photocatalytic oxidation (PCO). A HEPA filter is also able to capture some viruses and bacteria which are ≤0.3 μm. A HEPA filter is also able to capture floor dust which contains bacteroidia, clostridia, and bacilli. HEPA was commercialized in the 1950s, and the original term became a registered trademark and later a generic trademark for highly efficient filters. HEPA filters are used in applications that require contamination control, such as the manufacturing of hard disk drives, medical devices, semiconductors, nuclear, food and pharmaceutical products, as well as in hospitals, homes, and vehicles.

Mechanism

HEPA filters are composed of a mat of randomly arranged fibers. The fibers are typically composed of polypropylene or fiberglass with diameters between 0.5 and 2.0 micrometers. Most of the time, these filters are composed of tangled bundles of fine fibers. These fibers create a narrow convoluted pathway through which air passes. When the largest particles are passing through this pathway, the bundles of fibers behave like a kitchen sieve which physically blocks the particles from passing through. However, when smaller particles pass with the air, as the air twists and turns, the smaller particles cannot keep up with the motion of the air and thus they collide with the fibers. The smallest particles have very little inertia and they always move around the air molecules like they are bombarded by these molecules (Brownian motion). Because of their movement, they end up crashing into the fibers. Key factors affecting its functions are fiber diameter, filter thickness, and face velocity. The air space between HEPA filter fibers is typically much greater than 0.3 μm. HEPA filters in very high level for smallest particulate matter. Unlike sieves or membrane filters, where particles smaller than openings or pores can pass through, HEPA filters are designed to target a range of particle sizes. These particles are trapped (they stick to a fiber) through a combination of the following three mechanisms:

 Diffusion; particles below 0.3 μm are captured by diffusion in a HEPA filter. This mechanism is a result of the collision with gas molecules by the smallest particles, especially those below 0.1 μm in diameter.  The small particles are effectively blown or bounced around and collide with the filter media fibers.  This behavior is similar to Brownian motion and raises the probability that a particle will be stopped by either interception or impaction; this mechanism becomes dominant at lower airflow.
 Interception; particles following a line of flow in the air stream come within one radius of a fiber and adhere to it. Mid size particles are being captured by this process.
 Impaction; larger particles are unable to avoid fibers by following the curving contours of the air stream and are forced to embed in one of them directly; this effect increases with diminishing fiber separation and higher air flow velocity.

Diffusion predominates below the 0.1 μm diameter particle size, whilst impaction and interception predominate above 0.4 μm. In between, near the most penetrating particle size (MPPS) 0.21 μm, both diffusion and interception are comparatively inefficient. Because this is the weakest point in the filter's performance, the HEPA specifications use the retention of particles near this size (0.3 μm) to classify the filter. However it is possible for particles smaller than the MPPS to not have filtering efficiency greater than that of the MPPS. This is due to the fact that these particles can act as nucleation sites for mostly condensation and form particles near the MPPS.

Gas filtration
HEPA filters are designed to arrest very fine particles effectively, but they do not filter out gasses and odor molecules. Circumstances requiring filtration of volatile organic compounds, chemical vapors, or cigarette, pet or flatulence odors call for the use of an activated carbon (charcoal) or other type of filter instead of or in addition to a HEPA filter. Carbon cloth filters, claimed to be many times more efficient than the granular activated carbon form at adsorption of gaseous pollutants, are known as high efficiency gas adsorption filters (HEGA) and were originally developed by the British Armed Forces as a defense against chemical warfare.

Pre-filter and HEPA filter
A HEPA bag filter can be used in conjunction with a pre-filter (usually carbon-activated) to extend the usage life of the more expensive HEPA filter. In such setup, the first stage in the filtration process is made up of a pre-filter which removes most of the larger dust, hair, PM10 and pollen particles from the air. The second stage high-quality HEPA filter removes the finer particles that escape from the pre-filter. This is common in air handling units.

Specifications

HEPA filters, as defined by the United States Department of Energy (DOE) standard adopted by most American industries, remove at least 99.97% of aerosols 0.3 micrometers (μm) in diameter.

The specification used in the European Union: European Standard EN 1822-1:2019, from which ISO 29463 is derived, defines several classes of filters by their retention at the given most penetrating particle size (MPPS): Efficient Particulate Air filters (EPA), HEPA and Ultra Low Particulate Air filters (ULPA). The averaged efficiency of the filter is called "overall", and the efficiency at a specific point is called "local":

See also the different classes for air filters for comparison.

Today, a HEPA filter rating is applicable to any highly efficient air filter that can attain the same filter efficiency performance standards as a minimum and is equivalent to the more recent National Institute for Occupational Safety and Health P100 rating for respirator filters. The United States Department of Energy (DOE) has specific requirements for HEPA filters in DOE-regulated applications.

Marketing 
Some companies use a marketing term known as "True HEPA" to give consumers assurance that their air filters meet the HEPA standard, although this term has no legal or scientific meaning. Products that are marketed to be "HEPA-type," "HEPA-like," "HEPA-style" or "99% HEPA" do not satisfy the HEPA standard and may not have been tested in independent laboratories. Although such filters may come reasonably close to HEPA standards, others fall significantly short.

Efficacy and safety 
In general terms (and allowing for some variation depending on factors such as the air-flow rate, the physical properties of the particles being filtered, as well as engineering details of the entire filtration-system design and not just the filter-media properties), HEPA filters experience the most difficulty in capturing particles in the size range of 0.15 to 0.2 µm. HEPA filtration works by mechanical means, unlike ionic and ozone treatment technologies, which use negative ions and ozone gas respectively. So, the likelihood of potential triggering of pulmonary side-effects such as asthma and allergies is much lower with HEPA purifiers. 
   
To ensure that a HEPA filter is working efficiently, the filters should be inspected and changed at least every six months in commercial settings. In residential settings, and depending on the general ambient air quality, these filters can be changed every two to three years. Failing to change a HEPA filter in a timely fashion will result in it putting stress on the machine or system and not removing particles from the air properly. Additionally, depending on the gasketing materials chosen in the design of the system, a clogged HEPA filter can result in extensive bypassing of airflow around the filter.

Applications

Biomedical 
HEPA filters are critical in the prevention of the spread of airborne bacterial and viral organisms and, therefore, infection. Typically, medical use HEPA filtration systems also incorporate high-energy ultraviolet light units or panels with anti-microbial coating to kill off the live bacteria and viruses trapped by the filter media. Some of the best-rated HEPA units have an efficiency rating of 99.995%, which assures a very high level of protection against airborne disease transmission.

COVID-19 
SARS‑CoV‑2 is approximately 0.125 µm. Airborne droplets of SARS-CoV-2 could be captured by HEPA filters, even if they are on the floor.

Vacuum cleaners 

Many vacuum cleaners also use HEPA filters as part of their filtration systems. This is beneficial for asthma and allergy sufferers, because the HEPA filter traps the fine particles (such as pollen and house dust mite feces) which trigger allergy and asthma symptoms. For a HEPA filter in a vacuum cleaner to be effective, the vacuum cleaner must be designed so that all the air drawn into the machine is expelled through the filter, with none of the air leaking past it. This is often referred to as "Sealed HEPA" or sometimes the more vague "True HEPA". Vacuum cleaners simply labeled "HEPA" may have a HEPA filter, but not all air necessarily passes through it. Finally, vacuum cleaner filters marketed as "HEPA-like" will typically use a filter of a similar construction to HEPA, but without the filtering efficiency. Because of the extra density of a true HEPA filter, HEPA vacuum cleaners require more powerful motors to provide adequate cleaning power.

Some newer models claim to be better than the earlier ones with the inclusion of "washable" filters. Generally, washable true HEPA filters are expensive. A high-quality HEPA filter can trap 99.97% of dust particles that are 0.3 microns in diameter. For comparison's sake, a human hair is about 50 to 150 microns in diameter. So, a true HEPA filter is effectively trapping particles several hundred time smaller than the width of a human hair. Some manufacturers claim filter standards such as "HEPA 4," without explaining the meaning behind them. This refers to their Minimum Efficiency Reporting Value (MERV) rating. These ratings are used to rate the ability of an air cleaner filter to remove dust from the air as it passes through the filter. MERV is a standard used to measure the overall efficiency of a filter. The MERV scale ranges from 1 to 16, and measures a filter's ability to remove particles from 10 to 0.3 micrometer in size. Filters with higher ratings not only remove more particles from the air, but they also remove smaller particles.

Heating, ventilation, and air conditioning

Heating, ventilation, and air conditioning (HVAC) is technology that uses air filters, such as HEPA filters, to remove pollutants from the air either indoors or in vehicles. Pollutants include smoke, viruses, powders, etc., and can originate either outside or inside. HVAC is used to provide environmental comfort and in polluted cities to maintain health.

Vehicles

Airlines
Modern airliners use HEPA filters to reduce the spread of airborne pathogens in recirculated air. Critics have expressed concern about the effectiveness and state of repair of air filtering systems, since they think that much of the air in an airplane cabin is recirculated.  Almost all of the air in a pressurized aircraft is, in fact, brought in from the outside, circulated through the cabin and then exhausted through outflow valves in the rear of the aircraft. About 40 percent of the cabin's air goes through a HEPA filter and the other 60 percent comes from outside the plane. Certified air filters block and capture 99.97 percent of airborne particles.

Motor vehicles
In 2016, it was announced that the Tesla Model X would have the world's first HEPA-grade filter in a Tesla car. Following the release of the Model X, Tesla has updated the Model S to also have an optional HEPA air filter.

History

The idea behind the development of the HEPA filter was born from gas masks worn by soldiers fighting in World War II. A piece of paper found inserted into a German gas mask had a remarkably high capture efficiency for chemical smoke. The British Army Chemical Corps duplicated this and began to manufacture it in large quantities for their own service gas masks. They needed another solution for operational headquarters, where individual gas masks were impractical. The Army Chemical Corps developed a combination mechanical blower and air purifier unit, which incorporated cellulose-asbestos paper in a deeply-pleated form with spacers between the pleats. It was referred to as an "absolute" air filter and laid the groundwork for further research to come in developing the HEPA filter.

The next phase of the HEPA filter was designed in the 1940s and was used in the Manhattan Project to prevent the spread of airborne radioactive contaminants. The US Army Chemical Corps and National Defense Research Committee needed to develop a filter suitable for removing radioactive materials from the air. The Army Chemical Corps asked Nobel Laureate Irving Langmuir to recommend filter test methods and other general recommendations for creating the material to filter out these radioactive particles. He identified 0.3 micron size particles to be the "most penetrating size"—the most difficult and concerning.

It was commercialized in the 1950s, and the original term became a registered trademark and later a generic trademark for highly efficient filters.

Over the decades filters have evolved to satisfy the higher and higher demands for air quality in various high technology industries, such as aerospace, pharmaceutical industry, hospitals, health care, nuclear fuels, nuclear power, and integrated circuit fabrication.

See also
 
 
 
  – trap particles with high voltage
  – vacuum cleaner with high efficiency air filter
  (MERV)
 
  – Removes 99.999% of dust, pollen, mold, bacteria, and particles larger than 120 nm (0.12 μm)
 
 Corsi–Rosenthal Box

References

Further reading
 TSI Application Note ITI-041: Mechanisms of Filtration for High Efficiency Fibrous Filters

External links

Building biology
Air filters
Cleanroom technology
Gas technologies